Tusitala proxima is a jumping spider that lives in Tanzania.

References

Endemic fauna of Tanzania
Salticidae
Spiders of Africa
Fauna of Tanzania
Spiders described in 2000